Philip Twells (1808 – 8 May 1880) was a Conservative Party politician.

Life
He was the second son of John Twells and his wife Mary Line. He attended Charterhouse School, and matriculated in 1827 at Worcester College, Oxford, graduating B.A. in 1831, M.A. in 1833. He was a banker, and was called to the bar at Lincoln's Inn in 1834.

The family bank, set up by Matthias Attwood, traded as Spooner, Attwoods and Co. of Lombard Street. In 1863, the private bank Barclay, Bevan, Tritton and Co., precursor to the Barclay Group, took it over. At that point Twells became a partner in the enlarged concern.

Twells first stood for election for City of London in 1868 but was unsuccessful. He was then elected for the constituency in 1874 but did not stand for re-election in 1880.

Legacy

Twells died leaving £300,000. His widow Georgiana had the church of St Mary Magdalene, Enfield, built in his memory. It was designed by William Butterfield, and finished in 1883.

References

External links

 

Conservative Party (UK) MPs for English constituencies
UK MPs 1874–1880
1808 births
1880 deaths
People educated at Charterhouse School
Alumni of Worcester College, Oxford